Beycik may refer to the following places in Turkey:

 Beycik, Kemer, a village in the district of Kemer, Antalya Province
 Beycik, Nallıhan, a village in the district of Nallıhan, Ankara Province